Ford Motor Company's Lincoln division has produced three distinct Lincoln V12 engines:
 1932–1942 L-heads:
 1932–1933 Lincoln L-head V12 engine
 1933–1942 Lincoln L-head V12 engine
 1936–1948 Flatheads:
 1936–1948 Lincoln-Zephyr V12 engine

V12